Leonard Maison was an American lawyer and politician from New York.

Life
He practiced law at Poughkeepsie, New York. He married Helen Emott, and they had several children, among them Rev. Charles Augustus Maison (1824–1922); and Belinda Emott (Maison) Coffin (1821–1856) who was married to Owen T. Coffin.

Maison was a member of the New York State Senate (2nd D.) from 1834 to 1837, sitting in the 57th, 58th, 59th and 60th New York State Legislatures.

He was a brigadier general of artillery in the New York State Militia.

Sources
The New York Civil List compiled by Franklin Benjamin Hough (pages 130f and 143; Weed, Parsons and Co., 1858)
The New York Annual Register (1832; pg. 320)
Obituary Record of Yale Graduates ("Charles Augustus Maison", pg. 307)
Coffin genealogy at Family Tree Maker
OWEN T. COFFIN DEAD in NYT on July 23, 1899

Year of birth missing
Year of death missing
New York (state) state senators
New York (state) Jacksonians
19th-century American politicians
Politicians from Poughkeepsie, New York